Alfta GIF is a sports club in Alfta, Sweden, established on 10 November 1900. The club runs handball, ice hockey and soccer, earlier even bandy. The men's bandy team played in the Swedish top division in 1941. The men's soccer team has played in the Swedish third division. The ice hockey section was established in 1947. The skiing and track and field athletics sections have been inactive since 2002.

Kits

References

External links
 

1900 establishments in Sweden
Defunct bandy clubs in Sweden
Football clubs in Gävleborg County
Ice hockey teams in Sweden
Association football clubs established in 1900
Bandy clubs established in 1900
Handball clubs established in 1900
Ice hockey clubs established in 1900
Ice hockey teams in Gävleborg County
Swedish handball clubs
Athletics clubs in Sweden
Ski clubs in Sweden
Multi-sport clubs in Sweden